Edward Roberts may refer to:

Politics
Edward Roberts (Canadian politician) (1940–2022), Canadian politician and Lieutenant Governor of Newfoundland and Labrador
Edward Roberts (mayor) (c. 1690–c. 1752), mayor of Philadelphia
Edward Elliott Roberts (1863–1950), clerk, administrator, politician and Chief President of the Australian Natives' Association
Edward D. Roberts (1864–1920), California State Treasurer, 1911–1915

Sports

Cricket
Edward Roberts (New Zealand cricketer) (1891–1972)
Edward Roberts (South African cricketer) (1903–?)
Edward Allen Roberts (1907–1986), MCC and Minor Counties cricketer
Edward Stanley Roberts (1890–1964), Worcestershire cricketer

Other sports
Edward Roberts (athlete) (1892–1956), American track and field athlete
Edward Glenn Roberts Jr. or Fireball Roberts (1929–1964), American race car driver
Edward John Roberts or Ned Roberts, (1867–1940), Welsh rugby player

Others
Edward Roberts (bishop) (1908–2001), Church of England bishop
Edward Roberts (priest) (1877–1968), Anglican dean of Brecon Cathedral
Edward B. Roberts (born 1935), American technology writer and businessman
Edward Frederick Denis Roberts or E. F. D. Roberts (1927–1990), British librarian

See also
Ed Roberts (disambiguation)
Ned H. Roberts (1866–1948), gun writer, ballistician, firearms experimenter
Ted Roberts (1931–2015), screenwriter
Edward Robert (disambiguation)
Edward Robertson (disambiguation)